CP 55,244 is a chemical compound which is a cannabinoid receptor agonist. It has analgesic effects and is used in scientific research. It is an extremely potent CB1 full agonist with a Ki of 0.21 nM, making it more potent than the commonly used full agonist HU-210.

See also 
 CP 47,497
 CP 55,940

References 

Primary alcohols
Cyclohexanols
Cannabinoids
Decalins
Pfizer brands
Phenols